KMVT (channel 11) is a television station in Twin Falls, Idaho, United States, affiliated with CBS and The CW Plus. It is owned by Gray Television alongside low-power Fox/MyNetworkTV affiliate KSVT-LD (channel 14). The two stations share studios on Blue Lakes Boulevard North/US 93 in Twin Falls; KMVT's transmitter is located on Flat Top Butte in unincorporated Jerome County east of Jerome and US 93.

History
The station went on the air on June 1, 1955 as KLIX-TV, a sister station to KLIX radio (1310 AM). It has been a CBS affiliate since sign-on; however, in its early years the station carried programs from ABC and NBC. During the late 1950s, the station was also briefly affiliated with the NTA Film Network.

In 1957, Ogden, Utah businessman Abe Glasmann purchased the KLIX radio and TV stations and KUTV in Salt Lake City. In 1963, Glasmann later sold the radio station, which retained the call letters KLIX. He rechristened the TV station KMVT. "MVT" stood for "Magic Valley Television," reflecting the area's nickname of "Magic Valley."

In 1965, KMVT became the first television station in Idaho to broadcast local programs in color.

Arthur Mosby and his Western Broadcasting Company of Missoula, Montana, which operated KMSO-TV (now KECI-TV) in Missoula, acquired KMVT in 1970. In 1984, control of the station was transferred to the Chapman S. Root 1982 Living Trust. The Catamount Broadcast Group acquired the station in 1998 and sold it to the Neuhoff family in 2004.

On December 31, 1983, prior to its official premiere during Super Bowl XVIII the following month, KMVT notably aired Apple Computer's critically acclaimed Macintosh computer commercial "1984" shortly before midnight, to ensure the ad would qualify for industry awards which were only eligible for ads that aired during 1983. Tom Frank, the director-operator at the time, said that the station may have been chosen due to its remote location, and its proximity to Sun Valley, which he described as being a "part time home of many in the entertainment and advertising business".

In September 2006, KMVT began carrying The CW network on its DT2 subchannel, which was also seen on KTWT-LP (channel 43); in 2012, KTWT switched to MyNetworkTV (with CW programming remaining on the KMVT subchannel), then (after converting to digital operations on channel 14) to Fox. In 2014, KTWT became KSVT-LD.

On March 12, 2015, Neuhoff Communications announced the sale of KMVT and KSVT to Gray Television for $17.5 million, pending FCC approval. The sale was completed on July 1.

Programming

Syndicated programming
Syndicated programming on this station includes Wheel of Fortune, The Ellen DeGeneres Show, Dr. Phil, and Two and a Half Men among others.

News operation
KMVT is the area's only full-powered television station, and the only one airing a full schedule of local news focused on the Magic Valley. Both of the market's low-powered ABC and NBC affiliates serve as semi-satellites of Boise stations (KSAW-LD relays KIVI-TV while KTFT-LD repeats KTVB); although both outlets maintain local advertising sales offices next door to each other in Twin Falls, they serve mostly as Magic Valley bureaus for their parent stations. Previous Fox affiliate KXTF formerly simulcast a weeknight prime time newscast at 9 from its sister station KFXP, which focused exclusively on the Pocatello–Idaho Falls market. In April 2012, KMVT upgraded its newscast production to high definition level.

With the launch of Fox on sister station KTWT on July 1, 2012 there was a significant expansion of KMVT's news operation. More specifically, the CBS affiliate began producing a half-hour extension of Rise and Shine that is seen weekday mornings from 7 to 7:30 on the Fox station. In addition, KTWT added half-hour newscasts at 5 (airing on weeknights only) and 9 (seen every night). The Fox broadcasts have a separate news anchor on weeknights and feature more regional, national, and international news of the day as opposed to shows seen on KMVT. As with the CBS affiliate, shows seen on the Fox outlet can be seen in high definition. As of January 2013, the station has branded the two stations' news programming as one. Both are now called Idaho's First News and share the same anchors.

Technical information

Subchannels
The station's digital signal is multiplexed:

On July 1, 2012, KMVT-DT2 upgraded to a high definition feed (including Cable One digital channel 485) and KTWT (which is now KSVT-LD) began to be simulcast in 4:3 standard definition on a new third digital subchannel of KMVT.

Translators

References
Station history

External links

 The CW Twin Falls

Television channels and stations established in 1955
1955 establishments in Idaho
MVT
CBS network affiliates
Gray Television